Takeko (written: 武子 or 竹子) is a feminine Japanese given name. Notable people with the name include:

, Japanese poet
, Japanese soldier

Japanese feminine given names